The Houston Stealth were a women's professional basketball team in the National Women's Basketball League (NWBL).  Based in Houston, Texas, they played from 2002 to 2004.  They won the NWBL championship in two of their three years of existence.

External links
NWBL website (archive link)

Basketball teams in Houston
Defunct basketball teams in Texas
2002 establishments in Texas
2004 disestablishments in Texas
Basketball teams established in 2002
Basketball teams disestablished in 2004
Women's sports in Texas